Deserters is a Canadian drama film, released in 1983. Written and directed by Jack Darcus, the film stars Alan Scarfe as Ulysses Hawley, a United States Army officer who is in Canada undercover to arrest Vietnam War draft dodgers. The film's cast also includes Barbara March, Jon Bryden and Dermot Hennelly.

The film garnered six Genie Award nominations at the 5th Genie Awards in 1984, for Best Actor (Scarfe), Best Actress (March), Best Director (Darcus), Best Screenplay (Darcus), Best Editing (Darcus, Bill Roxborough, Doris Dyck and Ingrid Rosen) and Best Original Score (Michael Conway Baker).

References

External links 
 

1983 films
Canadian drama films
English-language Canadian films
Films directed by Jack Darcus
Draft evasion
1980s English-language films
1980s Canadian films